Yakimov may refer to:

Yakimov, Kursk Oblast, a khutor in Konyshyovsky District, Kursk Oblast (Russia)

Aleksandar Yakimov (b. 1989), Bulgarian footballer (soccer player)
Andrey Yakimov (b. 1989), Belarusian footballer (soccer player)
Dimitar Yakimov (b. 1941), Bulgarian footballer (soccer player)
Igor Yakimov (b. ? ), Russian judo champion
Yuriy Yakimov (b. 1953), Soviet and Russian rower

Russian-language surnames